Adrián Candrák (born 18 December 1982) is a Slovak football midfielder who currently plays for the Slovak Corgoň Liga club FC ViOn.

References

External links
 at fcvion.sk 

1982 births
Living people
Slovak footballers
Association football midfielders
FC ViOn Zlaté Moravce players
Slovak Super Liga players
Sportspeople from Topoľčany